Trawden Forest is a civil parish in Pendle, Lancashire, England.  It contains 39 listed buildings that are recorded in the National Heritage List for England.  Of these, six are at Grade II*, the middle grade, and the others are at Grade II, the lowest grade.  The parish contains the village of Trawden and the hamlets of Cottontree, Winewall, and Wycoller, and is otherwise completely rural.  Most of the listed buildings are houses and associated structures, farmhouses and farm buildings.  Six bridges are listed, two clapper bridges, a packhorse bridge, two medieval or post-medieval bridges, and a 19th-century road bridge.  The other listed buildings include a group of medieval stones, the ruins of a former large house, and a public house.

Key

Buildings

References

Citations

Sources

Lists of listed buildings in Lancashire
Buildings and structures in the Borough of Pendle